Alfred Hubbard (c. 1812 – 1887) was an alderman and mayor of Brisbane Municipal Council.

Personal life
Alfred Hubbard was born in England about 1812–1813, the son of Nathaniel and Rebecca Hubbard.

Alfred arrived in Brisbane in about 1860.

In 1875, Alfred Hubbard was living as a freeholder in Wharf Street, Brisbane.

Alfred Hubbard died aged 74 years on 2 Feb 1887 at his residence "The Poplars" at Labrador, Southport, Queensland following an illness of 2 years; he was survived by his widow Elizabeth.

Business life
In 1871 Alfred Hubbard was a shopkeeper in Queen Street.

In 1876 at the Brisbane Exhibition, Alfred Hubbard won second prize with his Little Wanzer in the sewing machine competition.

Public life
In 1874 Alfred Hubbard was a member of the Brisbane Hospital Committee.

Alfred Hubbard served as an alderman of North Ward on the Brisbane Municipal Council from 1875 to 1879 and was elected mayor of Brisbane in 1877 – 1878.

He served on the following committees:
 Finance Committee 1875
 Legislative Committee 1875 – 1878
 Improvement Committee 1877, 1878

In 1876 Alfred Hubbard was sworn in as a magistrate in Brisbane.

In April 1879, Alfred Hubbard resigned as an alderman and from the Local Health Committee.

Notes

External links

Mayors and Lord Mayors of Brisbane
1810s births
1887 deaths
19th-century Australian politicians